Flying Lessons may refer to:

Flying Lessons (2007 film), a 2007 Italian film starring Giovanna Mezzogiorno
Flying Lessons (2010 film), a 2010 American film starring Maggie Grace
Flying Lessons (album), a 2015 album by Fool's Gold